Clovis Community College may refer to:

 Clovis Community College (New Mexico)
 Clovis Community College (California)